Will Bashor (born Harold Willis Bashor, Jr.; 6 February 1951) is an American author of French history and international law.

Background and education 
Bashor received his doctorate in International Relations from the American Graduate School in Paris (2004), and he teaches at Franklin University, Columbus, Ohio. His interests have ranged over many fields, among them the study of international law and business, linguistics, cultural anthropology, and European history. He received his M.A. in French Literature from Ohio University and is an active member of the Society for French Historical Studies.

Awards 
Marie Antoinette's Head: The Royal Hairdresser, the Queen, and the Revolution was awarded the Adèle Mellen Prize for Distinguished Scholarship. This narrative of the life of Léonard Autié was also a top finalist for the 2013 USA Best Book Awards. In addition to the awards, Marie Antoinette's Head was one of the New York Post's five "must-read" books of the week, and it was featured in the 2013 Fall Vogue UK fashion issue as well as receiving the Kirkus Star Award.

Non-Fiction 

 Marie Antoinette's World: Intrigue, Infidelity, and Adultery in Versailles (Rowman & Littlefield, 2020)   
 Marie Antoinette's Darkest Days: Prisoner No. 280 in the Conciergerie (Rowman & Littlefield, 2016)
 Marie Antoinette's Head: The Royal Hairdresser, the Queen, and the Revolution (Lyons Press, 2013)
 Jean-Baptiste Cléry: Louis XVI and Marie Antoinette's Nightmare (Diderot Press, 2011; ASIN B006QQ23SY)
 The Moon Treaty Paradox (Xlibris, 2005)

References 

1951 births
Living people
Ohio University alumni
American male biographers
21st-century American biographers
Ohio Dominican University faculty
American expatriates in France
21st-century American historians
21st-century American male writers
American male non-fiction writers